Georg Drescher (17 March 1870 – 23 October 1938) was a German cyclist. He competed in the men's sprint event at the 1900 Summer Olympics.

References

External links
 

1870 births
1938 deaths
German male cyclists
Olympic cyclists of Germany
Cyclists at the 1900 Summer Olympics
Sportspeople from Mainz
Cyclists from Rhineland-Palatinate